Anywhere but Here may refer to:

Art and literature
 "Anywhere but Here" (Buffy comic), the tenth issue of Buffy the Vampire Slayer Season 8
 Anywhere but Here (novel), a book by Mona Simpson
 Anywhere but Here (film), a 1999 film based on the novel
Anywhere but Here, a manga series by Miki Tori

Music

Albums
 Anywhere but Here (The Ataris album), 1997
 Anywhere but Here (Chris Cagle album), 2005, or the title song
 Anywhere but Here (EP), solo EP by Gingger Shankar
 Anywhere but Here (Mayday Parade album), 2009
 Anywhere but Here (Kayak album), 2011 by Kayak

Songs
 "Anywhere but Here" (song), a 1993 song by Sammy Kershaw
 "Anywhere but Here", a song by Brice Long, later recorded by Chris Cagle
 "Anywhere but Here", a 1999 song by Yellowcard on their album Where We Stand
 "Anywhere but Here", a 2003 song by Hilary Duff from the soundtrack album A Cinderella Story
 "Anywhere but Here", a 2004 song by Rise Against on their album Siren Song of the Counter Culture
 "Anywhere but Here", a 2008 song by SafetySuit on their album Life Left to Go
"Anywhere But Here", a 2011 song by White Town on the album Monopole
 "Anywhere but Here", a 2013 song by Five Finger Death Punch on their album The Wrong Side of Heaven and the Righteous Side of Hell, Volume 1
 "Anywhere but Here", a 2015 song by Christina Aguilera from the soundtrack to Finding Neverland